Ivan Serhiyovych Lytvynenko (born 10 April 2001) is a Ukrainian professional footballer who plays as a midfielder.

Career
Lytvynenko is a product of Dnipro-1 academy.

Dnipro-1
In July 2018 he joined Dnipro-1 and made his debut for the club against Zirka Kropyvnytskyi on 17 November 2018 in the Ukrainian First League.

Dinamo Batumi
In February 2023 he moved to Dinamo Batumi.

References

External links

2001 births
Living people
Footballers from Dnipro
Ukrainian footballers
SC Dnipro-1 players
FC Rukh Lviv players
FC VPK-Ahro Shevchenkivka players
FC Chornomorets Odesa players
FC Dinamo Batumi players
Ukrainian First League players
Ukrainian Premier League players
Erovnuli Liga players
Association football midfielders
Ukraine youth international footballers
Expatriate footballers in Georgia (country)
Ukrainian expatriate sportspeople in Georgia (country)